Lieutenant General Charles Augustus Goodfellow  (27 November 1836 – 1 September 1915) was a British soldier and recipient of the Victoria Cross, the highest and most prestigious award for gallantry in the face of the enemy that can be awarded to British and Commonwealth forces.

Victoria Cross
Charles Augustus Goodfellow was born in Essex on 27 November 1836. On 6 October 1859 Goodfellow was a 22 year old officer of the Bombay Engineers, serving as a lieutenant in 4 Field Company of the Bombay Sappers, during the Indian Mutiny when the following deed took place for which he was awarded the VC:

Later service
Goodfellow later transferred to the Royal Engineers serving in the British Expedition to Abyssinia where he was mentioned in dispatches as follows:

Following the successful conclusion of the expedition, Goodfellow was assigned to conduct an archaeological excavation at Adulis, the ancient harbor of the Kingdom of Aksum, on behalf of the British Museum. Goodfellow uncovered the remains of a building and stone columns, fragments of marble and alabaster on which crude drawings had been made, pottery and coins. These items were later sent to the British Museum. Goodfellow later achieved the rank of lieutenant general, and was made a Companion of the Order of the Bath. He died at Leamington Spa on 1 September 1915, aged 78.

The medal
Goodfellow's Victoria Cross is displayed at the Royal Engineers Museum, Gillingham, England.

Citations

References
 
Monuments to Courage (David Harvey, 1999)
The Sapper VCs (Gerald Napier, 1998)

External links
Royal Engineers Museum Sappers VCs
Location of grave and VC medal (Warwickshire)

British recipients of the Victoria Cross
Indian Rebellion of 1857 recipients of the Victoria Cross
Companions of the Order of the Bath
British East India Company Army officers
People from Essex
1836 births
1915 deaths
British Army lieutenant generals
Royal Engineers officers
British military personnel of the Abyssinian War
Burials in Warwickshire
Military personnel from Essex